John Hubert Lacey MD FRCPsych (born 4 November 1944) is a British psychiatrist who is professor of psychiatry at St George's, University of London. He specialises in eating disorders and he is Director of the St George's Eating Disorders Service.

He was educated at Loughborough Grammar School, the University of St Andrews, the University of London and the University of Dundee.

External links 
 http://www.newbridge-health.org.uk/about-newbridge/our-staff/professor-hubert-lacey/

People educated at Loughborough Grammar School
1944 births
Living people
British psychiatrists
Alumni of the University of Dundee
Alumni of the University of St Andrews
Alumni of the University of London
Fellows of the Royal College of Psychiatrists
Academics of St George's, University of London